Gravë is a village in the former commune of Livadhe, Vlorë County, southern Albania. At the 2015 local government reform it became a subdivision of the municipality of Finiq. A 1993 study by Leonidas Kallivretakis found that the total population of the village was 674, all of them part of the Greek community in Albania.

References

Administrative units of Finiq
Former municipalities in Vlorë County
Villages in Vlorë County